The 2019 German Darts Masters was the third staging of the tournament by the Professional Darts Corporation, and was the second entry in the 2019 World Series of Darts. The tournament featured 16 players (eight PDC players facing eight regional qualifiers) and was held at the LANXESS arena in Cologne, Germany on 12–13 July 2019.

Mensur Suljović was the defending champion after defeating Dimitri Van den Bergh 8–2 in the 2018 final, but lost 8–3 to Gabriel Clemens in the semi-finals.

Peter Wright won his third World Series title and his second in Germany with an 8–6 win over Gabriel Clemens in the final.

Three of the top-ranked PDC players were beaten in the first round, a new record for the World Series.

Prize money
The total prize fund was £60,000.

Qualifiers
The eight invited PDC representatives are (with the top 4 seeded following the 2019 US Darts Masters):

  Peter Wright (champion)
  Michael van Gerwen (first round)
  Rob Cross (quarter-finals)
  Daryl Gurney (quarter-finals)
  Gary Anderson (first round)
  James Wade (semi-finals)
  Mensur Suljović (semi-finals)
  Raymond van Barneveld (first round)

The German qualifiers were:

Draw

References

German Darts Masters
German Darts Masters
World Series of Darts
Sports competitions in Cologne
German Darts Masters